This is a list of mountains in São Tomé and Príncipe.

List

See also
Lists of mountains by region
Geography of São Tomé and Príncipe

Notes

References

External links

Sao Tome Principe
Mountains
São Tomé and Príncipe